Midelt is a province in the Moroccan economic region of Drâa-Tafilalet. It was created in 2009 from parts of the provinces of Khénifra and Errachidia. Its centre of administration is the town Midelt.

Subdivisions
The province is divided administratively into the following municipalities and rural communes:

References

 
Midelt Province